Feast or Famine is the debut studio album by Chuck Ragan. It was recorded in 2007 at Mad Dog Studios in Burbank, California. It was produced by Ted Hutt, engineered by Ryan Mall and mixed by both Hutt and Mall.

Track listing

References

Chuck Ragan albums
2007 debut albums
SideOneDummy Records albums